Besseria is a genus of flies in the family Tachinidae.

Species
B. anthophila (Loew, 1871)
B. atra (Coquillett, 1897)
B. brevipennis (Loew, 1863)
B. caffra (Villeneuve, 1863)
B. dimidiata (Zetterstedt, 1844)
B. excavata Herting, 1979
B. incompleta Curran, 1926
B. lateritia (Meigen, 1824)
B. longicornis Zeegers, 2007
B. melanura (Meigen, 1824)
B. nuditibia Kugler, 1977
B. oblita Herting, 1979
B. pilimacula Herting, 1973
B. reflexa Robineau-Desvoidy, 1830
B. zonaria (Loew, 1847)

References

Phasiinae
Tachinidae genera
Taxa named by Jean-Baptiste Robineau-Desvoidy
Diptera of Asia